Charles George Daigh (November 29, 1923 – April 29, 2008) was an American racing car driver. He broke into Grand Prix racing through Lance Reventlow's Scarab team, through the virtue of being one of the resident engineers. Born in Long Beach, California, he participated in six World Championship Formula One races, debuting on May 29, 1960, and scoring no championship points. He also participated in one non-Championship Formula One race.

Following the 1960 season, Chuck Daigh went on to contest races in the International Formula league in Europe, driving the previous year's front-engined Scarab.  He finished eighth at Goodwood contesting the Lavant Cup and finished seventh in an attempt at the International Trophy.  He went on to crash out of the British Empire Trophy at Silverstone.

He was also a successful sportscar driver in America, winning the 1959 Sebring endurance classic & also tried to qualify twice for the Indianapolis 500, but without success. He also won the 1958 United States Sports Car Grand Prix at Riverside, California, driving a Scarab. This event was largely credited with launching professional sports car racing in the United States.

He died in hospital in Newport Beach, California after a brief battle with heart and respiratory problems.

Racing record

Formula One World Championship results
(key)

Complete British Saloon Car Championship results
(key) (Races in bold indicate pole position; races in italics indicate fastest lap.)

References

External links
Profile on Historic Racing

1923 births
2008 deaths
American Formula One drivers
Sportspeople from Long Beach, California
24 Hours of Le Mans drivers
Racing drivers from California
Scarab Formula One drivers
Cooper Formula One drivers
World Sportscar Championship drivers
12 Hours of Sebring drivers
British Touring Car Championship drivers
Carrera Panamericana drivers